Ixora stokesii is a species of flowering plant in the family Rubiaceae. It is endemic to the island Rapa-Iti in French Polynesia.

References

External links
World Checklist of Rubiaceae

stokesii
Flora of French Polynesia
Least concern plants
Taxonomy articles created by Polbot